Pieces by Rain is the third Korean-language extended play by South Korean singer Rain. It was released on March 3, 2021, by RAIN Company, Sublime Artist Agency and distributed by Kakao M. It is his first EP in three years, since My Life in 2017, and his first musical release since the single "Switch to Me" in January 2021.

The album contains a total of five tracks, including the lead single "Why Don't We", which features Chungha and the pre-release track "Switch to Me" with his mentor and former CEO J.Y. Park.

Background
The project marks Rain's first release in three years. He reunited with his mentor Park Jin-young to release the collaboration song "Switch to Me" on December 31, 2020. Rain also featured Chungha on his song "Why Don't We", which served as the lead single from Pieces by Rain. On March 3, 2021, Rain released the EP, which includes five songs, including "Switch to Me" and "Why Don't We".

Track listing

Charts

Accolades

Release history

References 

2021 EPs
Rain (entertainer) albums